DXRU (1188 AM) Radyo Ultra is a radio station owned and operated by Ultracraft Broadcasting Corporation. The station's studio is located at Suan Arcade, Masterson Ave., Brgy. Carmen, Cagayan de Oro, and its transmitter is located at Brgy. Taboc, Opol, Misamis Oriental.

The frequency was formerly used by DXIF from December 30, 1987, to April 22, 2011, when it transferred to 729 kHz.

References

Radio stations in Cagayan de Oro
Radio stations established in 2012